The purple swamphen has been split into the following species:

 Western swamphen,	Porphyrio porphyrio, southwest Europe and northwest Africa
 African swamphen, Porphyrio madagascariensis, sub-Saharan continental Africa and Madagascar
 Grey-headed swamphen,  Porphyrio poliocephalus, Middle East, through the Indian subcontinent to southern China and northern Thailand
 Black-backed swamphen, Porphyrio indicus, southeast Asia to Sulawesi
 Philippine swamphen, Porphyrio pulverulentus, Philippine islands
 Australasian swamphen, Porphyrio melanotus, Australia, New Zealand, and Oceania

See also 
 Swamphen, the genus Porphyrio

References

Birds by common name